Theutbald I (or Theobald, ; died 16 August 856) was the bishop of Langres from when he was elected to succeed Alberic (died 838) until his death. He is first securely attested as bishop in 842. He may have belonged to the same Bavarian family that had dominated the episcopate of Langres since 769.

In 841, at the start of open war between the three sons of Emperor Louis the Pious, Thibaut and Count Warin of Langres joined the side of the youngest brother, Charles the Bald. On 13 April, Thibaut was with Charles and his army at Sens, and celebrated Easter with him at Troyes on 17 April. As a result of Warin and Thibaut's support, the county of Langres fell on Charles's side of the border after the Treaty of Verdun (843) ended the war between the brothers.

Notes

Sources

856 deaths
Bishops of Langres
Year of birth missing